The pelagic cod (Melanonus gracilis) is a small deepwater fish found in the Southern Ocean.  It is one of only two species currently classified in the family Melanonidae, the other being the arrowtail, Melanonus zugmayeri.

The pelagic cod is found in subantarctic and temperate waters, occasionally being caught in the tropics.  It may be found at depths between 150 and 3600 m.  It is from the order Gadiformes, related to true cods.  It may grow up to 19 cm in length.  It has no commercial value.

References

 
 

pelagic cod
Fish of the Southern Ocean
pelagic cod
pelagic cod